Zhuanqiao Township is an rural township in Zhuzhou County, Zhuzhou City, Hunan Province, People's Republic of China.

Cityscape
The township is divided into 13 villages in the following areas: Miaowan Village, Zhuqian Village, Taitian Village, Quchi Village, Tiesha Village, Maji Village, Xichong Village, Huatian Village, Chuanshi Village, Shishuang Village, Wenjia Village, Shanmuqiao Village, and Lannichong Village (庙湾村、诸前村、太田村、曲尺村、铁沙村、马迹村、西冲村、花田村、川石村、石双村、文家村、杉木桥村、烂泥冲村).

Historic township-level divisions of Zhuzhou County